Cristina Cimino (born 20 February 1964 in Rome) is a retired Italian rhythmic gymnast.

She competed for Italy in the rhythmic gymnastics all-around competition at the 1984 Summer Olympics in Los Angeles. She was 15th in the qualification and advanced to the final, placing 15th overall.

References

External links 
 

1964 births
Living people
Italian rhythmic gymnasts
Gymnasts at the 1984 Summer Olympics
Olympic gymnasts of Italy
Gymnasts from Rome